The McKenzie Apartments is a residential high-rise building in Seattle, Washington. The 40-story skyscraper, located in the Denny Triangle neighborhood, was completed in 2018 and has 450 apartments.

History

Clise Properties, which owned much of the Denny Triangle prior to the 2010s development boom, proposed a 40-story high-rise residential building on the site in early 2014. An elliptical design was unveiled in October 2014, at the request of a design review committee and residents of a nearby condominium building.

The $284 million project, partially funded by a loan from the Bank of the Ozarks, broke ground in December 2015. It opened in July 2018.

Details

The ground floor includes a Wild Ginger restaurant, the company's third location in the Seattle area, which opened in August 2018.

References

Residential skyscrapers in Seattle
Residential buildings completed in 2018
2018 establishments in Washington (state)
Denny Triangle, Seattle